Paris Gaels GAA is a Gaelic Athletic Association club based in Paris, France. It was the first Gaelic games club in continental Europe to be affiliated with the GAA.

History
Gaelic games have a long, anecdotal history in Paris. The first recorded mention of Gaelic Games, was during the French revolution in 1789, when Irish priests from a seminary in central Paris were arrested while playing hurling on the outskirts of Paris. They were released soon afterwards after a translator had correctly explained that they were playing a game and not carrying out any military training or parades.

The club was founded officially in 1994 by Peter Gavigan, Liza Power, James Griffin et Sylvie Flemming, but joined the Gaelic Athletic Association in 1995 becoming the first club to do so in continental Europe. However, Irish expats in Paris had been playing hurling and Gaelic football on a regular basis since the early 1980s. The mid-90s in Europe saw Gaelic clubs being set up in nearly every capital city in Europe and the creation of the European County Board. Paris Gaels members were instrumental in the creation of the European County Board, but also in assisting the newer clubs to get up and running.

Early Days
The mix of people involved at the time were students, publicans, teachers, embassy staff and other professionals working for companies such the Irish Trade Board, Aer Lingus and some other non-governmental organisations. Much of the club's early activity was coordinated around the former Irish College in Paris, site of the current Centre Culturel Irlandais. In the summer of 1993, in the Champagne region of France, a Sports day was organised between Irish residents in Paris and the Luxembourg Irish association. A Gaelic football match was also organised by the Aer lingus GAA team and some of the Irish residents of Paris participated in that match. Two of the Irish residents from Paris involved that day were Peter Gavigan and Tom MacIntyre, decided that a sports society of some sort would benefit the Irish community in Paris.

"Basically, when mass was over we used to jump on the metro to go to Vincennes, while Sonny Delaney who had a car would pick up the gear from the pub Connolly's Corner and meet us out there" - Ann Donnelly - founding member.

The first official match of the club was a hurling fixture against Den Haag GAA, in May 1994 in La Courneuve, won by Paris. The players representing the Paris Gaels on that day were; Michael Maher, John O'Rourke, Enda Breen, Terry Devers, Peter Gavigan, Paul Carlile, Sonny Delaney, Hugh Liston, Tom Hillary & Liam Connolly.  Buoyed by the success of the match against Den Haag, the Paris Gaels decided to go on the road. A club in Brussels had started, taking advantage of the growing number of Irish émigrés working in the EU institutions. In October 1994, at the British School of Paris, the Paris Gaels played Brussels GAA. It was also the first  time that Paris played in their own jerseys. The match was a very tight affair, the half time the scores were level, but Brussels pulled away in the second half. The Paris team that lined out on that day were : Peadar Duignan, Johnny Hamill, Eddie Casey, John Ruane, Jim O'Mahoney, Peter Gavigan, Hugh Liston, Finoin Brown, Willie Fingleton and Padraig Fennessy. A bout of flu had kept Sonny Delaney, James Griffin and Michael O'Haodha out of action.

The trip to Brussels was also a memorable occasion as for the first time, the Ladies Football team played in a friendly match, the team that lined out were : Peter Gavigan, Liza Power, James Griffin et Sylvie Flemming, Ann Donnelly, Bridgit O'Connor, Helen Galvin, Maureen MacSharry, Phyllis Harte, Ann McSweeney and Aisling Long.

"Back in the early 90s, we hadn't the same kind of technology that exists today. There was no facebook, the internet was just being born and not many of us had a mobile phone either, but the one place where you could always meet Irish people was every Sunday at 11:30am for mass at the College des Irlandais, and it was there that the Paris Gaels GAA club was born."

2010 - present
At the start of the 2010s, the club went through significant changes. Up until 2009, most of the members and players had been Irish émigrés and students. However as Gaelic games, in particular Gaelic football became more and more popular in France, new clubs started to appear in towns and cities like Lyon, Clermont, Niort, Rennes, Bordeaux and Toulouse. The sport started to attract many new French players coming from sporting backgrounds such as soccer, rugby, basketball and Olympic handball. Paris was no exception, when in 2009 approximately 15 new French players enrolled playing in both the men's and ladies team. At present, the majority of Paris Gaels players and members are from France or outwith Ireland, while maintaining a sizeable contingent of players born in Ireland or with Irish backgrounds.

The club maintains a solid training schedule throughout the year, running weekly or biweekly training sessions in Gaelic football, hurling & camogie and handball at various locations around the city and suburbs of Paris.

Main Sponsors

The club's principal sponsor is Hannon Transport, an Irish logistics and haulage firm from Aghalee, County Antrim, which maintains a hub in Rungis, in the southern suburbs of Paris.

Honours 

French Men's Senior Football Championship: 6
2006, 2007, 2008, 2009, 2014, 2018
 European Men's Senior Football Championship: 4
2001, 2003, 2005, 2015
 French Ladies' Federal Football Championship: 1
2022
 European Ladies' Senior Football Championship: 1
2007

References

External links 
Official Site
Gaelic Games Europe site
Club twitter feed

Gaelic Athletic Association clubs established in 1995
Gaelic games clubs in Europe
Gaelic football clubs in Europe
Hurling clubs in Europe
Sports clubs in France
Sport in France
Sport in Paris